The 2014 Commonwealth Games (officially the XX Commonwealth Games) were held in Glasgow, Scotland, from 23 July to 3 August 2014.

It is the largest multi-sport event ever held in Scotland with around 4,950 athletes from 71 countries and territories competing in 18 different sports, although the country previously hosted the 1970 and 1986 Commonwealth Games in Edinburgh. Over the last 10 years, however, Glasgow and Scotland had staged World, Commonwealth, European, or British events in all 18 sports proposed for the 2014 Commonwealth Games, including the World Badminton Championships in 1997.

This page contains a chronological summary of major events from the Games.

Calendar

Day 0 – Wednesday 23 July
The Opening Ceremony was held at 21:00 at Celtic Park in Glasgow, Scotland.

Day 1 – Thursday 24 July
Sports during Day 1 included cycling, gymnastics, judo, swimming, triathlon and weightlifting.

Day 2 – Friday 25 July
Sports during Day 2 included cycling, gymnastics, judo, shooting, swimming and weightlifting.

Day 3 – Saturday 26 July
Sports during Day 3 included cycling, gymnastics, judo, lawn bowls, shooting, swimming, triathlon and weightlifting.

Day 4 – Sunday 27 July
Sports during Day 4 included athletics, cycling, lawn bowls, rugby sevens, shooting, swimming and weightlifting.

Day 5 – Monday 28 July
Sports during Day 5 included athletics, badminton, lawn bowls, shooting, squash, swimming and weightlifting.

Day 6 – Tuesday 29 July
Sports during Day 6 included athletics, cycling, gymnastics, shooting, swimming, wrestling and weightlifting.

Day 7 – Wednesday 30 July
Sports during Day 7 included athletics, diving, gymnastics, weightlifting, wrestling

Day 8 – Thursday 31 July
Sports during Day 8 included athletics, cycling, diving, gymnastics, lawn bowls, weightlifting, wrestling

Day 9 – Friday 1 August
Sports during Day 9 included athletics, diving, gymnastics, lawn bowls, table tennis

Day 10 – Saturday 2 August
Sports during Day 10 included athletics, boxing, diving, hockey, powerlifting, squash, table tennis

Day 11 – Sunday 3 August
Closing ceremony was held at 21:00 at Hampden Park in Glasgow, Scotland
Sports during Day 11 included badminton, cycling, hockey, netball, squash

References

2014 Commonwealth Games
Chronological summaries of the Commonwealth Games